Gongtang is a township in Damxung County in the Lhasa Prefecture of Tibet, China. Established in 1960, in 1970 it became a township. It has a population of around 4800 and contains four village committees. The economy is based on animal husbandry, mainly shepherding goats, sheep, cattle and horses.

Damxung Airport

Lhasa's first airport, Dancing Airport, was located just north of Gongtang from 1955 to 1965. After moving to Lhasa Gonggar Airport, the old airport site was partially occupied by a racetrack. All remaining infrastructure was removed with only footprint of runway present.

References

Populated places in Lhasa (prefecture-level city)
Township-level divisions of Tibet
Damxung County